Alpha-aminoadipic and alpha-ketoadipic aciduria is an autosomal recessive metabolic disorder characterized by an increased urinary excretion of alpha-ketoadipic acid and alpha-aminoadipic acid. It is caused by mutations in DHTKD1, which encodes the E1 subunit of the oxoglutarate dehydrogenase complex (alpha-ketoglutarate dehydrogenase complex).

References

Autosomal recessive disorders
Metabolic disorders